Africa Update is the quarterly newsletter of the African Studies Program at Central Connecticut State University.

References

External links
 

1993 establishments in Connecticut
African studies journals
Magazines established in 1993
Magazines published in Connecticut
Newsletters
Quarterly magazines published in the United States